Neacomys guianae, also known as the Guianan neacomys or Guiana bristly mouse, is a nocturnal rodent species from South America. It is found in lowland tropical rainforests in northeastern Brazil, French Guiana, Guyana, Suriname and Venezuela. Its diet consists of insects, seeds and fruit.

References

Literature cited
Patton, J. and Catzeflis, F. 2008. . In IUCN. IUCN Red List of Threatened Species. Version 2009.2. <www.iucnredlist.org>. Downloaded on November 25, 2009.
Musser, G.G. and Carleton, M.D. 2005. Superfamily Muroidea. Pp. 894–1531 in Wilson, D.E. and Reeder, D.M. (eds.). Mammal Species of the World: a taxonomic and geographic reference. 3rd ed. Baltimore: The Johns Hopkins University Press, 2 vols., 2142 pp. 

Neacomys
Mammals described in 1905
Taxa named by Oldfield Thomas